The green-headed oriole (Oriolus chlorocephalus), or montane oriole, is a species of bird in the family Oriolidae. It is found in eastern Africa.

Taxonomy and systematics

Subspecies
Three subspecies are recognized: 
 O. c. amani - Benson, 1946: Found in south-eastern Kenya and eastern Tanzania
 O. c. chlorocephalus - Shelley, 1896: Found in Malawi and central Mozambique
 O. c. speculifer - Clancey, 1969: Found in southern Mozambique

Distribution and habitat
Its natural habitats are subtropical or tropical, dry lowland forests and subtropical or tropical moist montane forests.

Behaviour and ecology
They feed on fruit, seeds, nectar and insects or insect larvae.

Gallery

References

External links

green-headed oriole
Birds of East Africa
green-headed oriole
Taxonomy articles created by Polbot